Bacchus and Ariadne (1522–1523) is an oil painting by Titian. It is one of a cycle of paintings on mythological subjects produced for Alfonso I d'Este, Duke of Ferrara, for the Camerino d'Alabastro – a private room in his palazzo in Ferrara decorated with paintings based on classical texts. An advance payment was given to Raphael, who originally held the commission for the subject of a Triumph of Bacchus. 

At the time of Raphael's death in 1520, only a preliminary drawing was completed. The commission was then handed to Titian. In the case of Bacchus and Ariadne, the subject matter was derived from the Roman poets Catullus and Ovid.

The painting, considered one of Titian's greatest works, now hangs in the National Gallery in London. The other major paintings in the cycle are The Feast of the Gods, mostly by Giovanni Bellini, now in the National Gallery of Art, Washington, D.C, and Titian's The Bacchanal of the Andrians and The Worship of Venus, both now in the Museo del Prado, Madrid.

Description
Ariadne has been left on the island of Naxos, deserted by her lover Theseus, whose ship sails away to the far left. She is discovered on the shore by the god Bacchus, leading a procession of revelers in a chariot drawn by two cheetahs. These were probably modelled on those in the Duke's menagerie and were tigers in Ovid's original text. Bacchus is depicted in mid-air as he leaps out of the chariot to protect Ariadne from these beasts. In the sky above the figure of Ariadne is the star constellation Corona Borealis, Northern crown. 

There are two possible variations of the story both going back to Ovid. In his Metamorphoses, Ovid has Bacchus throw the crown of Ariadne into the sky where it becomes the constellation Northern Crown. In Ars Amatoria, Bacchus promises the entire sky to Ariadne where she then would become the constellation Northern Crown. 

The National Gallery's website states that in the painting, "Bacchus, god of wine, emerges with his followers from the landscape to the right. Falling in love with Ariadne on first sight, he leaps from his chariot, drawn by two cheetahs, towards her. Ariadne had been abandoned on the Greek island of Naxos by Theseus, whose ship is shown in the distance. The picture shows her initial fear of Bacchus, but he raised her to heaven and turned her into a constellation, represented by the stars above her head."

The composition is divided diagonally into two triangles, one of blue sky, using the expensive ultramarine pigment, and still but for the two lovers caught in movement, the other a riot of movement and predominantly green/brown in colour. The follower of Bacchus who struggles with a snake is sometimes falsely associated with the antique sculpture of Laocoön and His Sons who had been killed by snakes. This statue had recently been discovered in Rome. But the satyr in Titian's painting is not in a mortal combat with the snakes, he is merely girding himself with them as is described in the original text by Catullus. The King Charles Spaniel that barks at the boy satyr is a common motif in Titian's work and was probably a court pet. The gold urn inscribed with the artist's signature (TICIANVS) may also have been familiar to the Duke as one of the antiquities in his collection.

The analysis of pigments used by Titian in this painting has been undertaken by scientists at the National Gallery in London and this analysis is illustrated at ColourLex.

Restoration
The canvas on which Bacchus and Ariadne is painted was rolled up twice in the first century of its existence, which had consequences for the painting. From the turn of the 19th century onwards it was frequently being restored to stop paint from flaking off, with the most controversial restoration being that carried out at the National Gallery between 1967 and 1968. This greatly brightened the surface of the painting, and came as something of a shock to many viewers, used to a heavy varnish finish.  When discoloured varnish lying directly on top of the paint surface was removed, some of the paint itself came off as well and repainting was necessary.

This has caused some critics to note that the expanse of blue sky on the left-hand side, one of the worst-affected areas of the painting, appears flat and pallid. It has also been argued that the removal of the varnish has left the painting tonally out of balance, since Titian is likely to have added some subtle glazes to the paint surface in order to tone down some of the more jarring colors. The National Gallery maintains that this was an unavoidable loss, because the accrued layers of later varnish had turned the painting brown and sludgy and had to be removed.  More recent examination has confirmed that the paint remains largely original.

Other paintings
There are many other paintings of the subject in museum collections, including the following: 
Giovan Battista Pittoni (1720–25), in the Louvre
Guido Reni (Los Angeles)
Ferdinand Bol, Hermitage Museum
Eustache Le Sueur, Boston MFA
Sebastiano Ricci, Chiswick House
Jacopo Tintoretto, Bacchus, Venus and Ariadne, Doge's Palace, Venice.

A copy of Titian's painting by Nicolas Poussin is part of the collection at Alnwick Castle.

References in other media
John Keats alluded to this painting (which was brought to England in 1806) in his "Ode to a Nightingale" ("Away! away! for I will fly to thee, Not charioted by Bacchus and his pards") and in Lamia ("Upon her crest she wore a wannish fire/Sprinkled with stars, like Ariadne's tiar").

Letitia Elizabeth Landon reviews this work in her poem Bacchus and Ariadne, first published in 1822, as a Dramatic Scene, being a dialogue between Leonardi and Alvine.

The painting was the basis for the cover of the album God Shuffled His Feet by rock band Crash Test Dummies.

The Indonesian composer Ananda Sukarlan has made a musical work for flute and piano, "Rescuing Ariadne" after being inspired by Titian's painting in the National Gallery of London.

In her novel Misalliance, Anita Brookner alludes to Titian's painting and depicts the encounter between Ariadne and Bacchus as an "ecstatic moment of recognition  [...], so immediate that Bacchus' foot has not had time to touch the ground as he leaps from his chariot, so shocking that Ariadne flings up a hand protest."

Notes

References

External links

National Gallery page
High definition image on Google art
Patrick Hunt, Titian's BACCHUS AND ARIADNE (1520–23) from Classical Art and Literature
Titian, Bacchus and Ariadne, ColourLex.com
Mapping Titian, Bacchus and Ariadne, Provenance of the painting on a map 

1523 paintings
Paintings by Titian in the National Gallery, London
Paintings of Bacchus
Paintings commissioned for the camerini d'alabastro
Paintings depicting Greek myths
Dogs in paintings by Titian
Cats in art
Water in art
Paintings based on Metamorphoses
Mythological paintings by Titian
Ariadne